The Eczema Area and Severity Index (EASI) is a tool for the measurement of severity of atopic dermatitis. It ranges from 0 (no eczema) to 72.

EASI is one of the core outcome instruments recommended to be included in all clinical trials on atopic dermatitis.

See also
 Psoriasis Area and Severity Index (PASI)

References

External links
  With calculation guide and scoring pictures.
  Information on how to use EASI, scoring sheets, and details of all core outcome instruments including EASI for all eczema / atopic dermatitis trials.
  Web Components for calculating EASI scores
Medical scales
Dermatologic terminology